Turori George (born 8 August 1943) also known as Toro George born in Aitutaki, Cook Islands is a Cook Islander/New Zealander amateur featherweight and professional feather/super featherweight boxer of the 1960s and '70s who as an amateur won a bronze medal at featherweight losing to eventual silver medal winner Ali Juma of Kenya in the Boxing at the 1962 British Empire and Commonwealth Games in Perth, Western Australia, and as a professional won the New Zealand Boxing Association featherweight title, Australasian featherweight title, and Commonwealth featherweight title, his professional fighting weight varied from , i.e. featherweight to , i.e. super featherweight.

References

External links

Image - Toro George

1943 births
Boxers at the 1962 British Empire and Commonwealth Games
Commonwealth Games bronze medallists for New Zealand
Cook Island male boxers
New Zealand professional boxing champions
Featherweight boxers
Living people
People from Rarotonga
Super-featherweight boxers
New Zealand male boxers
Commonwealth Boxing Council champions
Commonwealth Games medallists in boxing
Medallists at the 1962 British Empire and Commonwealth Games